The Tale of Tiffany Lust, also known as Body Lust,  is a 1979 American adult erotic film. The film was directed by Radley Metzger (as "Henry Paris", uncredited) and filmed in several elaborate locations in New York City.

The film was released  during the Golden Age of Porn (inaugurated by the 1969 release of Andy Warhol Blue Movie) in the United States, at a time of "porno chic", in which adult erotic films were just beginning to be widely released, publicly discussed by celebrities (like Johnny Carson and Bob Hope) and taken seriously by film critics (like Roger Ebert).

Premise
Betty, a friend, suggests that Tiffany, a housewife seeking a way to enrich her love life, see Florence Nightingale on her radio show where guests are welcome to enjoy erotic activities in front of a live audience. Later, Tiffany discovers that her husband is enjoying similar activities of his own.

Cast

 Candida Royalle as Guest #19
 Desiree Cousteau as Girl in Bar
 Dominique Saint Claire as Tiffany
 George Payne as Tiffany's Husband 
 Ron Jeremy as Guest #9
 Samantha Fox as Girl in Sauna
 Vanessa del Rio as Florence Nightgale
 Veronica Hart as Betty

Notes
According to one film reviewer, Radley Metzger's films, including those made during the Golden Age of Porn (1969–1984), are noted for their "lavish design, witty screenplays, and a penchant for the unusual camera angle". Another reviewer noted that his films were "highly artistic — and often cerebral ... and often featured gorgeous cinematography". Film and audio works by Metzger have been added to the permanent collection of the Museum of Modern Art (MoMA) in New York City.

See also

 Andy Warhol filmography
 Erotic art
 Golden Age of Porn
 Erotic films in the United States
 Erotic photography
 List of American films of 1979
 Sex in film
 Unsimulated sex

References

Further reading
 
 Heffernan, Kevin, "A social poetics of pornography", Quarterly Review of Film and Video, Volume 15, Issue 3, December 1994, pp. 77–83. .
 Lehman, Peter, Pornography: film and culture, Rutgers depth of field series, Rutgers University Press, 2006, .
 Williams, Linda, Hard core: power, pleasure, and the "frenzy of the visible", University of California Press, 1999, .

External links
 .

American erotic films
Films directed by Radley Metzger
1979 films
1970s pornographic films
1970s English-language films
1970s American films